The Autofähre Beckenried–Gersau, or Beckenried–Gersau car ferry, is a Swiss car ferry that operates across the centre of Lake Lucerne between the lakeside towns of Beckenried and Gersau. It operates from the beginning of April to mid-October.

The service has operated since 1930, with some interruptions during World War II. It still uses the same ferry boat, the motor vessel Tellsprung, which was built in 1929 and extensively rebuilt in 1963.

See also 
Lake Lucerne Navigation Company

References

External links 

Official web site of the Beckenried–Gersau ferry (in German)

Ferry transport in Switzerland
Lake Lucerne
Shipping companies of Switzerland
Transport in Nidwalden
Transport in the canton of Schwyz
Nidwalden–Schwyz border